Pisola Fort is a fort located  from Nashik, in the Nashik district of Maharashtra, India. This fort lies exactly on the borders of Dhule & Nashik District. One side is in Sakri Taluka & another is in Satana Taluka. Though this fort is an important fort in Nashik district, it is less visited by trekkers. In Satana taluka, there are four forts in a line on the Galna hill range, the Pisol fort, Dermal fort, Kankrala fort and Galna fort. This fort is easy to climb but requires one hour to reach the fort.

History
Much less history about this fort is known.

How to reach
The nearest town is Satana which is 90 km from Nashik. The base village of the fort is Wadi Pisol which is 35 km from Satana. There are good hotels at Nampur or Taharabad, and now tea and snacks are also available in small hotels at Wadi Pisol. The trekking path starts from the hillock west of the village. The route is very safe and passes through dense scrub. There is no marked path which leads to the fort, so it is advisable to hire a local guide from the village. It takes about one hour to reach the scarp of the fort. A narrow path along the small ravine leads to the rock cut steps. The steps pass through a broken arch gate. The entrance gate is nowhere seen. There is plenty of water available on the fort.

Also the another nearest town is Sakri, Dist: Dhule. You can easily reach to the base on another side of the fort.

Places to see
The only structure in good condition is a small mosque on the western edge of the fort. A night stay at the fort can be made in the caves or mosque on the fort. The rock-cut arch-gate of the pleasure palace of Rang Mahal stands in good condition with all its walls fallen to ruins. There are two rock-cut water cisterns on the scarp near the entrance with rock-cut figures of Nandi Bull and Lingas. It takes about one hour to visit all places on the fort.

See also 

 List of forts in Maharashtra
 List of forts in India
 Marathi People
 Battles involving the Maratha Empire
 Maratha Army
 Maratha titles
 Military history of India
 List of people involved in the Maratha Empire

References 

Buildings and structures of the Maratha Empire
Forts in Nashik district
16th-century forts in India